Cave Stream, also known as Broken River Cave, is a  long cave in New Zealand, located on State Highway 73.

It is a popular site for passing tourists, however in spring and during heavy rains it can be dangerous to enter the cave. There have been two deaths in the cave, one due to drowning and one to hypothermia. The cave is easy to explore when the river is low. There is a minor waterfall to climb at the far end, although bolts and chains make this easy to negotiate.

References

External links

Cave Stream Scenic Reserve
Showcaves.com

Landforms of Canterbury, New Zealand
Caves of New Zealand
Protected areas of Canterbury, New Zealand